The 2017–18 Illinois Fighting Illini women's basketball team represented the University of Illinois during the 2017–18 NCAA Division I women's basketball season. The Fighting Illini, led by first-year head coach Nancy Fahey, played their home games at State Farm Center as members of the Big Ten Conference. They finished the season 9–21, 0–16 in Big Ten play to finish in last place. They lost in the first round of the Big Ten women's tournament to Penn State.

Previous season 
The Illini finished the 2016–17 season 9–22, 3–13 in Big Ten play to finish in a four-way tie for 11th place. They advanced to the second round of the Big Ten women's tournament where they lost to Purdue.

On March 14, 2017, head coach Matt Bollant was fired. He finished at Illinois with a five-year record of 61–94. On March 22, the school hired five-time Division III national champion and two-time Division III coach of the year recipient Nancy Fahey as head coach.

Roster

Schedule and results

|-
! colspan="9" style=| Non-conference regular season

|-

|-

|-

|-

|-

|-

|-

|-

|-

|-

|-

|-

|-

|-
! colspan="9" style=| Big Ten conference season

|-

|-

|-

|-

|-

|-

|-

|-

|-

|-

|-

|-

|-

|-

|-

|-
! colspan="9" style=| Big Ten Women's Tournament

Rankings

See also
2017–18 Illinois Fighting Illini men's basketball team

References

Illinois Fighting Illini women's basketball seasons
Illinois
Fight
Fight